Yasny is a rural locality (a settlement) and the administrative center of Shilegskoye Rural Settlement of Pinezhsky District, Arkhangelsk Oblast, Russia. The population was 1,299 as of 2010. There are 17 streets.

Geography 
Yasny is located on the Pinega River, 20 km west of Karpogory (the district's administrative centre) by road. Shilega is the nearest rural locality.

References 

Rural localities in Pinezhsky District